Acmaeops pratensis is a species of the Lepturinae subfamily in the long-horned beetle family. This beetle is distributed in Austria, Belarus, Bosnia and Herzegovina, Bulgaria, Canada, Croatia, Czech Republic, Estonia, Finland, France, Germany, Hungary, China, Italy, Kazakhstan, Latvia, Lithuania, Moldova, Mongolia, Montenegro, North Macedonia, Norway, Poland, Romania, Russia, Serbia, Slovakia, Slovenia, Spain, Sweden, Switzerland, Ukraine, and the United States. The adult beetle feeds on Norway spruce.

Subtaxa
There are two varieties in the species:
 Acmaeops pratensis var. obscuripennis Pic, 1901
 Acmaeops pratensis var. suturalis (Mulsant, 1863)

References

Lepturinae